"Heartbreak U.S.A." is a 1961 song by Kitty Wells.  The single became one of Wells' most successful releases as a solo artist. "Heartbreak U.S.A." was Kitty Wells' third and final number one on the US country singles chart, staying at the top spot for four weeks during a twenty-three week chart run.  The B-side of "Heartbreak U.S.A.", entitled "There Must Be Another Way to Live", reached number twenty on the country chart.

Chart performance

Cover versions
Jeanne Black released a version of the song as a single in November 1961, but it did not chart.

References

1961 songs
1961 singles
Kitty Wells songs
Songs written by Harlan Howard
Song recordings produced by Owen Bradley
Decca Records singles
Capitol Records singles